Alice Inez Buffett  is a political figure and linguist from the Australian territory of Norfolk Island.

Political role

In 1981 Alice Buffett stood for and was elected to serve as a member of the Norfolk Legislative Assembly.

Buffett was awarded the Medal of the Order of Australian in the 1998 Australia Day Honours for "service to the Norfolk Island community, particularly as a member of the Legislative Assembly advocating initiatives to improve health care facilities and social infrastructure".

Linguist

Alice Buffett is also a noted linguist. She is the author of "Speak Norfuk Today", widely recognised as the most complete resource on the Norfuk language in existence; this work was prepared with the collaboration of the late Dr. Donald Laycock of the Australian National University.

See also
 Pitkern

References 

Living people
Members of the Norfolk Legislative Assembly
Year of birth missing (living people)
Recipients of the Medal of the Order of Australia